Four ships of the Royal Navy have been named HMS Majestic, whilst another was planned:
  was a 74-gun third rate launched in 1785, razeed into a 56-gun fourth-rate frigate in 1814 and broken up in 1816 after a stranding.
  was a screw-propelled 80-gun second rate launched in 1853 and broken up in 1868.
 HMS Majestic was to have been a  battleship. She was renamed Edinburgh two days before being launched in 1882, and was sold in 1910.
  was  launched in 1895 and sunk by U-21 in 1915.
  was a  launched in 1945. She was broken up in 1985.

See also
 , a First World War auxiliary minesweeper sunk in 1916

Royal Navy ship names